Allein unter Bauern (Alone Among Farmers) was a German comedy television series, commissioned by Sat.1 and produced by Phoenix. It aired for ten episodes between 2006 and 2007 and was cancelled on 4 May 2007.

See also
List of German television series

External links
 

German comedy television series
2006 German television series debuts
2007 German television series endings
German-language television shows
Sat.1 original programming